The 2022 South and Central American Women's Club Handball Championship the 2nd edition of this tournament was held in Buenos Aires, Argentina from 30 May to 5 June 2022.

Participating teams
 Ferro Carril Oeste
 CID Moreno
 River Plate
 Clube Português
 EC Pinheiros
 Club Italiano BM
 Ovalle Balonmano
 Cerro Porteño
 Scuola Italiana di Montevideo
 BBC Layva

Preliminary round
All times are local (UTC–3).

Group A

Group B

Knockout stage

Bracket

Ninth place game

5–8th place semifinals

Semifinals

Seventh place game

Fifth place game

Third place game

Final

Final standing

All-star team

Source:

References

South and Central American Women's Club Handball Championship
International handball competitions hosted by Argentina
South and Central American Women's Club Handball Championship
South and Central American Women's Club Handball Championship
South and Central American Women's Club Handball Championship